Pedro Llompart Usón (born January 9, 1982) is a Spanish professional basketball player who last played for HLA Alicante of the Spanish LEB Oro.

Career
Llompart made his debut at Liga ACB on 9 October 2003, with Pamesa Valencia, playing 53 seconds in the defeat against Adecco Estudiantes by 76–78.

He was loaned several seasons to teams of the LEB Oro until he left Pamesa Valencia on 2007 for signing with Tenerife Baloncesto. Llompart came back to Liga ACB on 2009, after promoting from LEB Oro with Lucentum Alicante. He played in the team of the Valencian Community until 2012, when Lucentum Alicante is relegated by its financial trouble and he signs with CAI Zaragoza. On 24 July 2015, he parted ways with Zaragoza.

In July 2015, Llompart signed a two-year contract with Gipuzkoa Basket.

On November 22, 2017, Llompart signed a two-month deal with the Italian basketball club Pallacanestro Reggiana. In the 2017-18 season he averaged 7.1 points and 4.4 assists per game while shooting 53% from the three-point line. He re-signed with the club on June 30, 2018.

References

External links
 ACB Profile
 FEB profile
 Eurocup profile

1982 births
Living people
AB Castelló players
Basket Zaragoza players
CB Canarias players
CB Lucentum Alicante players
CB Murcia players
Gipuzkoa Basket players
Lega Basket Serie A players
Liga ACB players
Pallacanestro Reggiana players
Point guards
Spanish men's basketball players
Sportspeople from Palma de Mallorca
Valencia Basket players